Everett Kevin Osmond (July 13, 1936 – March 13, 2015) was a business owner and politician in Newfoundland. He represented St. Barbe in the Newfoundland House of Assembly from 1982 to 1985.

With a partner, Osmond operated a restaurant and lounge in the town of Woody Point. He also served as the town mayor. He was elected to the Newfoundland assembly in 1982 as a Progressive Conservative. He married Blanche Burden.

References 

1936 births
2015 deaths
Progressive Conservative Party of Newfoundland and Labrador MHAs
Mayors of places in Newfoundland and Labrador